Bishop of Quebec may refer to:
 Bishop of the Anglican Diocese of Quebec
 Archbishop of the Roman Catholic Archdiocese of Quebec